Crista Moore is an American actress, singer, and dancer known for her work on the Broadway stage. She has been nominated for two Tony Awards, and received a Theatre World Award for Exceptional Broadway Debut in the title role of "Gypsy".

Theatre
Moore made her Broadway debut starring in the 1989-91 Tony Award winning revival of Gypsy with Tyne Daly. She played the role of Louise/Gypsy, for which she was nominated in 1990 for her first Tony Award for Best Performance by a Featured Actress in a Musical. She was also nominated for a Drama Desk Award and Outer Critics Circle Award for her performance. The New York Times critic Frank Rich said of her performance, "It's the title character, not Rose, that Gypsy asks the audience to root for, and the lovely Ms. Moore, who steadily blossoms from a forgotten child to a self-possessed star, makes it easy to do so." John Simon of New York Magazine said, "Crista Moore runs the gamut from self-abnegating duckling to dazzling swan with seamless perfection. She is the first performer to justify the show’s title being not Rose but Gypsy.”

She next starred as Polly in the First National Tour of Crazy for You opposite James Brennan, succeeding Karen Ziemba. The production was directed by Mike Ockrent and choreographed by Susan Stroman.

Moore next appeared on Broadway in 1996 in the musical Big (based on the 1988 film) in which she created the role of Susan Lawrence (played in the film by Elizabeth Perkins). For this performance, Moore was nominated for her second Tony Award, this time for Best Performance by a Leading Actress in a Musical. Big played for 193 performances.

Her next Broadway appearance came in 2000 with the Broadway debut of the Noël Coward play Waiting in the Wings. Moore played the supporting role of Zelda Fenwick in a cast that included Lauren Bacall, Rosemary Harris and Helen Stenborg. The play ran for 186 performances. In 2004, Moore performed in a Broadway revival of the Tom Stoppard play Jumpers that ran for 89 performances. In 2005 she was a part of the ensemble cast of Manhattan Theatre Club's Broadway revival of Absurd Person Singular.

Moore has starred in musicals for New York City Opera including the title role in  Rodgers and Hammerstein’s Cinderella, which marked the New York stage premiere of the production and led Moore to a featured television appearance, singing a duet live on NBC’s Macy’s Thanksgiving Day Parade. She also appeared in New York City Opera productions as Eileen in Wonderful Town and Snookie in 110 in the Shade, the latter choreographed by Susan Stroman and directed by Scott Ellis. She was asked to reprise the role of Cinderella for Cleveland Opera's production the following year.

Moore's Off-Broadway credits include the 2001 production of Tartuffe at the Tribeca Playhouse (Elmire), Stars in Your Eyes at the Cherry Lane Theatre in 1999,  David Ives' Long Ago and Far Away for Ensemble Studio Theatre in 1992 (in which she created the role of Laura), the revival of "Rags" at the American Jewish Theatre (Bella) and Birds of Paradise at the Promenade Theatre in 1987 with JK Simmons, Donna Murphy and Mary Beth Peil.

In the Salzburg Marionette Theatre’s 2007 world premiere production of The Sound Of Music, Moore, along with Christiane Noll & Jonathan Groff, lends her voice as Baroness Elsa Shraeder to this unique & critically praised North American and European tour performed to a fully orchestrated recording with the Istropolis Philharmonic Orchestra, presented entirely with marionettes.

Moore originated the role of Alice Beineke on the First National Tour of The Addams Family that was created on Broadway by Carolee Carmello.

In the World Premiere of the 2015 New York Spring Spectacular at Radio City Music Hall, she created the role of Isabella.

Recently, Moore guest starred in Off-Broadway's Nassim at New York City Center.

Film and television
Featured roles in film and television include independent filmmaker  Todd Solondz's film Storytelling (which played the 2001 Cannes Film Festival), Law and Order: SVU, All My Children and Days of Our Lives as well as appearances on CNN and Entertainment Tonight.

Recordings
Moore’s musical recordings include the original cast recordings of Gypsy (1989), Big (1996) and Birds of Paradise (1987) as well as vocal performances on Varèse Sarabande  Labels' Unsung Sondheim, Unsung Irving Berlin, Unsung Musicals, Lost in Boston IV, Peter Pan, Cinderella, Primetime Musicals and Shakespeare on Broadway.

Awards and nominations

References

External links
 
 
 

American musical theatre actresses
Living people
Year of birth missing (living people)
21st-century American women